Ule is a Chinese e-commerce platform. A joint venture of TOM Group and China Post, Ule focuses on online-to-offline shopping in rural areas of China.

History 
Ule was founded in 2009. In 2017, the Malaysia External Trade Development Corp partnered with Ule to sell Malaysian products through the platform.

As of 2017, the platform had 250,000 stores on it.

References 

Online marketplaces of China
Chinese companies established in 2009